Ezra Garfield Dumart (October 27, 1882 – July 23, 1954) was a Canadian professional ice hockey player. He played with the Toronto Tecumsehs of the National Hockey Association in the 1912–1913 season, for one game. He previously played in the Ontario Professional Hockey League with the Berlin Dutchmen.

His nephew, Woody Dumart would also play hockey, with the Boston Bruins from 1937–1954. Woody Dumart was inducted into the Hockey Hall of Fame in 1992.

References

External links
Ezra Dumart at JustSportsStats

1882 births
1954 deaths
Canadian ice hockey centres
Ice hockey people from Ontario
People from Huron County, Ontario
Toronto Tecumsehs players